Maryann Corbett (née Zillotti, Washington, D.C.) is an American poet, medievalist, and linguist.

She grew up in northern Virginia. She did her undergraduate work at the College of William and Mary in Williamsburg, Virginia, and graduated with a doctorate in English from the University of Minnesota.

Her work has appeared in Southwest Review, Barrow Street, Rattle, River Styx, Atlanta Review, The Evansville Review, Measure, Literary Imagination, The Dark Horse, Italian Americana, Mezzo Cammin, Linebreak, Subtropics, Verse Daily, American Life in Poetry, The Poetry Foundation, The Writer's Almanac, and many other venues in print and online, as well as an assortment of anthologies, including The Best American Poetry 2018. She has been a several-time Pushcart and Best of the Net nominee; a finalist for the 2009 Morton Marr Prize, the 2010 Best of the Net anthology, and the 2011 and 2016 Able Muse Book Prize; and a winner of the Lyric Memorial Award, the Willis Barnstone Translation Prize, and the Richard Wilbur Award. Her third book, Mid Evil, is the Wilbur Award winner and has been published by the University of Evansville Press.

She has worked as a writing teacher and master indexer for the Minnesota Legislature, where she has served in the state Office of the Revisor of Statutes for 35 years.
She lives in St. Paul, Minnesota.

Awards

Works

Sample poems
"Concourse", 32 Poems, Fall/Winter 2016
"Prayer Concerning the New, More 'Accurate' Translation of Certain Prayers", Rattle, April 26, 2017; The Best American Poetry 2018
"Apophatic", Rattle, January 16, 2015
"Before"; "Variorum", Umbrella Journal, 2008
"Hand", Strong Verse, 10/30/2008
"Sacred Harp Convention", Poetry Porch
"A Meditation on Dactylic Hexameter", The Barefoot Muse

Collections
In Code, Able Muse Press (November 27, 2020), 
Street View, Able Muse Press (September 11, 2017), 
 Mid Evil, University of Evansville Press; (January, 2015), 
Credo for the Checkout Line in Winter, Able Muse Press; (September, 2013), 
Breath Control, David Robert Books; (February 1, 2012), 
Dissonance, Scienter Press; (December 1, 2009), 
Gardening in a Time of War (Pudding House, 2007).

Essays
"Blank Verse and Blinders", Shit Creek Review, 
	Directory of indexing and abstracting courses and seminars, Editor Maryann Corbett, Information Today, Inc., 1998,

References

External links
 
 

American poets of Italian descent
American women poets
American writers of Italian descent
College of William & Mary alumni
Employees of the Minnesota Legislature
Living people
Poets from Minnesota
Poets from Washington, D.C.
Poets from Virginia
University of Minnesota College of Liberal Arts alumni
Year of birth missing (living people)